The Last Outlaw can refer to:

 The Last Outlaw (1919 film), a 1919 silent film
 The Last Outlaw (1927 film), a 1927 American Western silent film
 The Last Outlaw (1936 film), a 1936 American Western film
 The Last Outlaw (miniseries), a 1980 Australian miniseries
 The Last Outlaw (1993 film), a 1993 television film
 The Undertaker, a professional wrestler known as The Last Outlaw